Lexington Park is a neighborhood in the Northeast section of Philadelphia, Pennsylvania.  It is bounded on the west by Roosevelt Boulevard, and on the north, east and south by Pennypack Park.  The neighborhood is made up mostly of twin and single homes built in the years following the Second World War, and a few apartment buildings built not long thereafter.  There are some commercial establishments along Rhawn Street and Roosevelt Boulevard.  Convenience to the park makes it an attractive location for families with children.  Lexington Park is also home to Nazareth Hospital.

External links
 A map of the neighborhood from Windows Live Local can be viewed here.

Neighborhoods in Philadelphia
Northeast Philadelphia